Main Khayal Hoon Kisi Aur Ka (lit: I am the thought of someone else), is a Pakistani romantic drama serial, directed by Emraan Kaleem Mallick and written by Shabana Ghulam Nabi which started airing on Hum TV on 23 June 2018 replacing Khamoshi.

It stars Hareem Farooq and Ali Rehman Khan on their third on-screen appearance together after Diyar-e-Dil and Parchi and is produced by IRK Films.

Plot 
The story revolves around the sacrifice of love and a broken relationship.

Cast 
 Hareem Farooq as Dania Aziz
 Ali Rehman Khan as Zaryab Safdar
 Alamdar Hussain as Arman Safdar
 Rucksar Naaz as Sonia
 Sabina Ahmed as Anita
 Imran Farooq as Arsal
 Mahjabeen Ahsan
 Anjum Habibi as Aziz
 Zia Gurchani as Safdar
 Shahid Qayyum Mirza
 Rabia Saeed
 Zahra Kazmi
 Shahram Akram
 Jhalak

Production 
Speaking about her role Hareem told Instep and Images, "My character is that of a simple girl, Dania, who is in love with this man, Zaryab, but is forced into marriage. She is entangled in a lot of emotions and complications."

See also 
 List of programs broadcast by Hum TV

References

External links 
 Official website

Pakistani television series
2018 Pakistani television series debuts